is a former Japanese football player and manager. He played for Japan national team. His younger brother Tetsuji Hashiratani is also a former footballer.

Club career
Hashiratani was born in Kyoto on 1 March 1961. After graduating from Kokushikan University, he started his senior career with Nissan Motors since 1983 and played with Nissan for 9 seasons until transferred to Urawa Reds in 1992, right before J1 League's inauguration. He experienced another transfer to Kashiwa Reysol, then playing in Japan Football League in June 1994. Kashiwa was promoted to J.League as of the end of 1994 season, and he also made his return to the top flight. After 2 1/2 seasons playing with Kashiwa, he retired as a player.

National team career
In August 1979, when Hashiratani was a Kokushikan University student, he was selected Japan U-20 national team for 1979 World Youth Championship. On 8 February 1981, he debuted for Japan national team against Malaysia. In 1982, he was selected Japan for 1982 Asian Games. He also played at 1984 Summer Olympics qualification and 1986 World Cup qualification. In September 1986, he was selected Japan for 1986 Asian Games. This Game was his last game for Japan. He played 29 games and scored 3 goals for Japan until 1986.

Coaching career
After obtaining J.League's S-grade coach license in 1999, Hashiratani started his coaching career with Montedio Yamagata, where he managed for 3 years from 2001 season to 2003 season. After 6 months of absence, he was named as a manager of Kyoto Purple Sanga in June 2004 when Kyoto was playing in the 2nd division, then contributed to Kyoto's promotion back to the top flight after the 2005 season. However, due to the poor performances and turnouts of the club, he was dismissed on 3 October about 2 months before the end of 2006 season.

He was named as a manager of Tochigi SC playing in Japan Football League in 2007. After two seasons, he made Tochigi eligible to be promoted to J2 League as the club finished 2nd in 2008 season, but was dismissed because he was unable to reach the consent with top managements about his pay, as well as recruiting of new players.

He was named as a General Manager of Urawa in December 2009, but was dismissed due to Urawa's poor performance in 2011 season.

After spending one season as a commentator in 2012, he was named manager of Giravanz Kitakyushu, which had a J2 License. The team was promoted to the J1 League in 2017, when a new stadium was to be completed.

Club statistics

National team statistics

Managerial statistics

References

External links
 
 
 Japan National Football Team Database
 
 

1961 births
Living people
Kokushikan University alumni
Association football people from Kyoto Prefecture
Japanese footballers
Japan youth international footballers
Japan international footballers
Japan Soccer League players
J1 League players
Japan Football League (1992–1998) players
Yokohama F. Marinos players
Urawa Red Diamonds players
Kashiwa Reysol players
Japanese football managers
J1 League managers
J2 League managers
Montedio Yamagata managers
Kyoto Sanga FC managers
Tochigi SC managers
Giravanz Kitakyushu managers
Footballers at the 1982 Asian Games
Footballers at the 1986 Asian Games
Association football forwards
Asian Games competitors for Japan